Islam in Madagascar is a minority religion, with most Madagascans adhering to Christianity. Due to secular nature of the Madagascar's constitution, Muslims are free to proselytize and build places of worship in the country.

Islam has been well established in what is now known as Madagascar for centuries and today Muslims represent 2 to 25 percent of the total population. The vast majority of Muslims in Madagascar practice Sunni Islam of the Shafi school of jurisprudence, with sizeable Shia and Ahmadiyya communities.

Demographics 
Followers constitute approximately  2 to 7 percent of the population, or 15 to 25 percent according to while according to local scholarly sources. The majority of the Muslims of Madagascar live in the coastal and north-western regions of the country. The ethnic makeup of the Muslim community includes Indians, Pakistanis, Comorians, and the native Malagasy peoples.

Conversions 
There is a growing number of ethnic Malagasy converts to Islam in Madagascar. It is hypothesized that several hundred thousand Malagasy convert to Islam each year.

Historical background

Settlement of Arabs

Beginning in the 10th or 11th century, Arab, and Somali, worked their way down the east coast of Africa in their dhows and established settlements on the west coast of Madagascar. The most noteworthy of these were the Zafiraminia, traditional ancestors of the Antemoro, Antanosy and other east coast ethnicities. The last wave of Arab immigrants would be the Antalaotra who immigrated from eastern African colonies. They settled the north-west of the island (Majunga area) and were the first to actually bring Islam to the island.

Arab and Somali Muslim immigrants were few in total number compared to the Indonesians and Bantus, but they left a lasting impression. The Malagasy names for seasons, months, days, and coins are Islamic in origin, as is the practice of circumcision, the communal grain pool, and different forms of salutation. The Arab magicians, known as the ombiasy, established themselves in the courts of many Malagasy tribal kingdoms. The Arab-Somali immigrants brought their patriarchal system of family and clan of non-Islamic civilization rule to Madagascar, which differed from the Polynesian matriarchal system. Sorabe is an alphabet based on Arabic used to transcribe the Malagasy language and the Antemoro dialect in particular. The Arabs were also the first to correctly identify the origin of most Malagasy by suggesting that the island was colonized by the Indonesians.

Colonization and Independence

Upon independence from France in 1960, Madagascar began developing close ties with staunchly secular Soviet Union. This stifled the development of all religion in Madagascar including Islam. However, in the 1980s, Madagascar drifted away from the Soviet Union and back towards France.

Issues 
Even after the passage of the nationality law in 2017, Muslims born in the country reported that members of the community have been unable to obtain Malagasy nationality despite generations of residence. 

Some Malagasy Muslims have also reported difficulty in obtaining official or governmental documents at public administration offices due to their non-Malagasy sounding names. Some Muslims have also reportedly faced ridicule and harassment for being perceived as foreigners despite possessing national identity cards.

See also 

 Antemoro 
 Antanosy
 Antankarana
Religion in Madagascar

References

 
Madagascar